Edmund Borowski (23 January 1945 – 22 August 2022) was a Polish sprinter who specialized in the 400 metres.

At the 1966 European Championships he won a gold medal in the 4 x 400 metres relay together with Jan Werner, Stanisław Grędziński and Andrzej Badeński. At the 1967 European Indoor Games he won a silver medal in the 4 x 300 metres relay, which he ran together with Edward Romanowski, Ján Balachowski and Tadeusz Jaworski.
 At the 1968 European Indoor Games he won a silver medal in the medley relay, which he ran with Marian Dudziak, Waldemar Korycki and Andrzej Badeński. Another silver medal in medley relay followed at the 1970 European Indoor Championships, this time together with Stanisław Waśkiewicz, Kazimierz Wardak and Eryk Żelazny.

Borowski died on 22 August 2022, at the age of 77; he had previously been battling with cancer.

References

1945 births
2022 deaths
Polish male sprinters
People from Kętrzyn County
European Athletics Championships medalists
Sportspeople from Warmian-Masurian Voivodeship
Zawisza Bydgoszcz athletes